KJMP (870 AM, "Jump 104.5") is a radio station broadcasting a classic hip hop format. Licensed to Pierce, Colorado, United States, the station serves the Fort Collins-Greeley area. The station was formerly owned by White Park Broadcasting, Inc. In August 2009 ownership was transferred to Brahmin Broadcasting Corporation.

History
When KJMP first came on air in 2004, it was simulcasting KJAC 105.5 FM.

On August 20, 2012, KJMP changed formats from sports to oldies, branded as "The Big 870".

On November 21, 2016, KJMP began testing an oldies format by simulcasting on 96.9 FM KYAP in Nunn, Colorado.

On November 21, 2019, KJMP changed their format from oldies to classic hip hop, branded as "Jump 104.5". The station is now operated via LMA by Loud Media.

Previous logo

References

External links

JMP
Radio stations established in 2004
Classic hip hop radio stations in the United States